The Grand Forks Air Defense Sector (GFADS) is an inactive United States Air Force organization.  Its last assignment was with the Air Defense Command 29th Air Division,  being stationed at Grand Forks Air Force Base, North Dakota.  It was inactivated on 1 December 1963

History
Established in December 1957 assuming control of former ADC Central Air Defense Force units with a mission to provide air defense of most of North Dakota along with western Minnesota and northern South Dakota.   The organization provided command and control over several aircraft and radar squadrons.

On 15 November 1959, the new Semi Automatic Ground Environment (SAGE) Direction Center (DC-11) became operational.    DC-11  was equipped with dual AN/FSQ-7 Computers.   The day-to-day operations of the command was to train and maintain tactical flying units flying jet interceptor aircraft (F-94 Starfire; F-102 Delta Dagger; F-106 Delta Dart) in a state of readiness with training missions and series of exercises with SAC and other units simulating interceptions of incoming enemy aircraft.

Consolidated on 1 May 1963 with Minot Air Defense Sector.  Inactivated on 1 December 1963 as part of ADC reorganization and consolidation, most units being reassigned to the 29th Air Division.

Lineage
 Established as Grand Forks Air Defense Sector on 8 December 1957
 Inactivated on 1 December 1963

Assignments
 31st Air Division, 8 December 1957
 29th Air Division, 1 January 1959 – 1 December 1963

Stations
 Grand Forks AFB, North Dakota, 8 December 1957 – 1 December 1963

Components

Wing
 478th Fighter Wing (Air Defense)
 Grand Forks AFB, North Dakota, 1 February 1961-1 July 1963

Wing
 478th Fighter Group (Air Defense)
 Grand Forks AFB, North Dakota, 1 April 1959-1 February 1961

Interceptor Squadrons
 18th Fighter-Interceptor Squadron
 Grand Forks AFB, North Dakota, 1 July-4 September 1963

Radar Squadrons

 721st Radar Squadron
 Willmar AFS, Minnesota, 1 April 1959-1 June 1961
 739th Radar Squadron
 Wadena AFS, Minnesota, 1 April 1959-4 September 1963
 785th Radar Squadron
 Finley AFS, Minnesota, 1 April 1959-4 September 1963

 787th Radar Squadron
 Chandler AFS, Minnesota, 1 March 1961-4 September 1963
 903d Radar Squadron
 Gettysburg AFS, South Dakota, 4 September 1963-1 April 1966
 916th Aircraft Control and Warning Squadron
 Beausejour AS, Manitoba, 1 April 1959-1 October 1961

See also
 List of USAF Aerospace Defense Command General Surveillance Radar Stations
 Aerospace Defense Command Fighter Squadrons

References

  A Handbook of Aerospace Defense Organization 1946 - 1980,  by Lloyd H. Cornett and Mildred W. Johnson, Office of History, Aerospace Defense Center, Peterson Air Force Base, Colorado
 Winkler, David F. (1997), Searching the skies: the legacy of the United States Cold War defense radar program. Prepared for United States Air Force Headquarters Air Combat Command.
 Maurer, Maurer (1983). Air Force Combat Units Of World War II. Maxwell AFB, Alabama: Office of Air Force History. .
 Ravenstein, Charles A. (1984). Air Force Combat Wings Lineage and Honors Histories 1947–1977. Maxwell AFB, Alabama: Office of Air Force History. .
 Radomes.org Grand Forks Air Defense Sector

Air Defense
1957 establishments in North Dakota
1966 disestablishments in North Dakota
Military units and formations disestablished in 1966